Tommie Earl Jenkins (born November 13, 1965), also credited in some productions as Tee Jaye or Tommie Jenkins, is an American actor, musician and stage performer most noted for his work as Ubercorn from the television show Go Jetters. Go Jetters was nominated for a 2016 BAFTA in the Preschool - Animation section. Other notable work includes the origination of the role Barry Belson in Jersey Boys, and the narration of the audiobook Twelve Years a Slave and the narration of two documentaries released concurrently with Roots. Tommie Jenkins also provided motion capture and voice acting for the character Die-Hardman in Hideo Kojima's award-winning video game, Death Stranding (2019).

Personal life 
A native of Canton, Ohio, Jenkins has spent more than twenty years in the United Kingdom. He returned to the United States in 2014.

In 2000, Jenkins married Jye Frasca.

Career 
Tommie Earl Jenkins originally trained as a classical ballet dancer. He has worked with the Canton Ballet in Ohio, the Duluth Ballet of Minnesota and the Alvin Ailey American Dance Theater in New York City. He has worked in numerous theatrical performances as both a dancer and actor as well as a film and voice actor.

Filmography

Theatre

Film

Television

Video games

Audiobooks

Music videos

Music

Awards and nominations

References

External links 

 
 
 

Living people
American male film actors
American male musical theatre actors
American male television actors
American male video game actors
American male voice actors
American LGBT actors
1965 births
20th-century American male actors
21st-century American male actors